Nasos (Athanasios) Iliopoulos (born in Athens on 20 December 1983) is a Greek politician. He has served as a Deputy Minister for Labour, Social Insurance and Social Solidarity.

Early life and education
He was born on 20 December 1983 in Athens. He studied at the computer department of Athens University of Economics and Business and has completed his post-graduate studies at the department of Political Science and History of Panteio University, in which he is a potential doctor. He has worked in private education and has collaborated with the Rosa Luxembourg foundation.

Political career
In 2002 he joined SYN Youth and from 2010 until 2013 served as the Secretary of its Central Committee. He is a member of the Central Committee of SYRIZA and used to be a member of the Political Secretariat of the party.

In 2014 he was elected as a regional councilor for Central Attica with Rena Dourou's combination "Power of Life". In the January 2015 Greek legislative election, he stood as a candidate in Athens A with SYRIZA, failing to get elected.

On 11 November 2016 he took over the position of Special Secretary of SEPE. From 28 February 2018 until 15 February 2019 he served as  Deputy Minister for Labour, Social Insurance and Social Solidarity in the Second Tsipras Cabinet.

On 21 December 2018 he announced his candidacy for the Athens Mayoral Race. On the first round of the election he got 35.392 votes and 16,98% of the vote and moved to the second round, where, he however was ultimately defeated by his rival, Kostas Bakoyannis, getting 51.487 votes and 34,75% of the vote.

In the 2019 elections he was placed on the eighth spot of the national ballot of SYRIZA.

On 1 September 2019 he was sworn in as a Municipal Councilor for Athens.

In September 2020 he took over as SYRIZA's Press representative, during the reshuffling of the party.

References

External links
Official facebook account

Greek politicians
Politicians from Athens
1983 births
Living people